Djeli Moussa Diawara, born 1962 in Kankan, Guinea, is a Kora player (Korafola), composer and singer.

Biography 
Djeli Moussa Diawara (also known as Jali Musa Jawara) was born to a Griot family. His father was a balafon player, and his mother a singer. His half-brother, sharing the same mother, was Mory Kanté. He is a "jali," or "djeli", a Mandinka word for griot. He learnt to play the balafon, the kora and the guitar.

At 18 he played with his half-brother, who left the Rail Band, in Abidjan, Côte d'Ivoire. Starting his solo career, he worked with Djenne Doumbia, a singer who later joined Salif Keita's group.

In 1982, his first LP Yasimika was recorded. Then, he left for Europe. England first for a tour where he shared the stage with Ali Farka Touré, and finally settled in Paris.

His Flamenkora album was published in 1998, offering a rich blend of styles, from his Mandingo roots to Flamenco. In 2000, Djeli Moussa recorded "Ocean Blues – from Africa to Hawaï" with Bob Brozman, which received good reviews.

Since then, he founded Kora Jazz Trio, joined by Abdoulaye Diabaté (sénégal) (piano) and Moussa Cissoko (drums). Djeli Moussa composed most of the tracks, particularly those on which he sings, and he played the kora and sometimes the guitar on the three albums released so far (Part I, II, & III).

Singer and musician, Djeli Moussa developed an intimate relationship with his 32-stringed Kora, which is unique and was adapted at his request from the 21-stringed traditional Kora. He is able to adapt to many different rhythms, from traditional mandingo to salsa, flamenco, blues and jazz.

He has worked with many artists, including Ali Farka Touré, Carlos Santana, Manu Dibango, Janice deRosa, Stephan Eicher, and Cheick Tidiane Seck.

Discography 
Solo
1983 Yasimika (LP – republished as CD in 1991)
1988 Soubindoor (World Circuit)
1992 Cimadan
1996 Sobindo
1998 Flamenkora
2000 Ocean Blues – from Africa to Hawaï with Bob Brozman
2006 Sini
2010 Yasimika (Abidjan 1982), remastered version of Djeli Moussa's first album
2011 Yékéké (Paris 2010)

With Kora Jazz Trio
2003 Part I
2005 Part II
2008 Part III

Miscellaneous
1985 – Johnny Copeland – Djeli Moussa composed and played Djeli, Djeli Blues as Johnny's Special Guest, on "Bringin' It All Back Home"
2009 – Mayra Andrade "Stória, stória..."
2006 – OST for Eliane de Latour movie "Après l'océan" – song Kanta
2005 – OST by Manu Dibango for Michel Ocelot French animated feature film "Kirikou et les bêtes sauvages"

External links 
Djeli Moussa Diawara's Youtube Channel
Djeli Moussa Diawara on Soundcloud
Djeli Moussa Diawara's MySpace Page

1962 births
Living people
Guinean male singers
Guinean Kora players
People from Kankan